"Bailamos" is a single by Spanish singer Enrique Iglesias sung in Spanglish. The song was released in 1999 as part of the soundtrack to the film Wild Wild West (1999) and later as the lead single from Iglesias's fourth and debut English-language album, Enrique (1999). "Bailamos" reached number one on the Spanish Singles Chart and on the US Billboard Hot 100, and it became a top-three hit in Canada, Hungary, New Zealand, Norway, and Sweden. In both New Zealand and Spain, it was the second-most-successful single of 1999.

Background

"Bailamos" was written by Paul Barry and Mark Taylor and produced by Barry and Brian Rawling, the same team which wrote and produced Cher's hit "Believe". The track first appeared on a limited edition of his Spanish studio album Cosas del Amor and was released as a single in parts of Latin America and Europe. After attending one of Enrique's concerts in March 1999, Will Smith asked Enrique to contribute to the soundtrack of his upcoming movie Wild Wild West and "Bailamos" was chosen to appear. The song quickly became most requested on pop radio in New York, Los Angeles and Miami. Due to the song's popularity, it was released as a single throughout the world. In English, "Bailamos" means "We Dance" (We Are Dancing). In the United States, the song was seen as part of a wave of crossover music from Latin American singers and a general increase in interest in Latin music, which was started by Ricky Martin's release "Livin' la Vida Loca" as well as Carlos Santana's collaboration with Matchbox 20 frontman Rob Thomas of "Smooth". The success of "Bailamos" was a breakthrough for Iglesias, which enabled him to sign a multi-album deal with Interscope Records. The song would go on to appear on his debut English album Enrique, though slightly altered to fit with the sound of the album. The soundtrack version has a different arrangement in mix from the version of the album.

Critical reception
Larry Flick from Billboard wrote that the song "has all the makings of a smash, with or without the burgeoning Latin-pop explosion." He noted that "sporting a flamenco guitar and other Southwestern influences amid a contemporary shuffling beat, "Bailamos" moves along at a pace that's much more relaxed than [Ricky] Martin's "Livin' La Vida Loca", but it is still lively enough to work up a bit of a froth on the dancefloor circuit, especially after it gets a tasty remix treatment, which is bound to be in the works. The hook here is as satisfying as lemonade on a hot summer day, thanks to songwriters Paul Barry and Mark Taylor, the team behind Cher's worldwide smash "Believe"". He also added that Iglesias is "an enchanting and sensuous presence, and with this exceptional song he certainly seems poised for the greatest breakthrough of his career." The Daily Vault's Michael R. Smith called it a "bold" anthem, noting that it perhaps is one of "the most memorable cuts" of the album. Leah Greenblatt  from Entertainment Weekly described it as a "horn-heavy invitation to the dance floor". Swedish newspaper Expressen said that it "sounds like a mix" of George Michael and Julio Iglesias.

Commercial performance
The track peaked at number one for two weeks on the US Billboard Hot 100 and became the 11th number-one single for Iglesias on the Billboard Hot Latin Tracks chart for one week. The single also peaked at number one on the Billboard Hot Dance Club Songs, while on the Billboard Adult Contemporary Songs chart, it reached number 25. Internationally, "Bailamos" topped the Spanish Singles Chart for five weeks and reached the top 10 in Walloon Belgium, Canada, Germany, Iceland, the Netherlands, New Zealand, Norway, Sweden, Switzerland and the United Kingdom. In New Zealand "Bailamos" was the second-most successful single of 1999, behind Lou Bega's rendition of "Mambo No. 5".

Music videos
The song was adapted into three different music videos:
 The original music video for the song was shot in Miami. It has a montage of different scenes involving Iglesias, starting off with a scene of Iglesias in an apartment talking on the phone and later looking out of a window to the Miami skyline. Subsequent scenes involve Iglesias walking the streets and staring into a building as he watches two salsa dancers. 
 After the song was chosen to be part of the Wild Wild West soundtrack, a second video directed by Nigel Dick was made. A portion of this video was shot in Mexico, while most of it shot in the backlot at Universal Studios. In this video, Iglesias is depicted as a wanted man with the opening shot being a poster calling for his capture "dead or alive". Entering a sleepy Mexican town, he attracts several women who dance around him. Picking one out, they kiss until they are interrupted by people trying to claim the reward to which both Iglesias and his love interest manage to escape. The video also contains small snippets of scenes from the Wild Wild West film. 
 The third music video of the song is directed by Paul Hunter, another famous music video director. Unlike the first two, this video is plotless and simply features Iglesias as a barman in a night club as he watches salsa dancers on stage. It is also intercut with shots of Iglesias interacting with the lead dancer played by Staci Flood. The video ends with Iglesias and Flood leaving the now-empty club.

Track listings

European CD single
 "Bailamos"
 "Nunca te olvidaré"
 "Bailamos" (Groove Brothers remix)

UK CD1
 "Bailamos" (album version) – 3:37
 "Bailamos" (The Groove Brothers remix) – 5:06
 "Bailamos" (Fernando's Latin mix) – 5:30

UK CD2
 "Bailamos" (The Groove Brothers radio edit) – 3:25
 "Bailamos" (Davidson Ospina club mix) – 6:08
 "Bailamos" (video—Paul Hunter version) – 3:36

UK cassette single
 "Bailamos" (album version) – 3:37
 "Bailamos" (The Groove Brothers radio edit) – 3:25

US CD and cassette single
 "Bailamos" (album version) – 3:38
 "Bailamos" (Latin radio mix) – 3:45

US maxi-CD single
 "Bailamos" (Harry "Choo Choo" Romero & Eric Morillo vocal mix) – 6:29
 "Bailamos" (Fernando G. Latin mix) – 5:30
 "Bailamos" (Ospina Club Anthem mix) – 6:08
 "Bailamos" (Pablo La Rosa techno dub) – 6:13
 "Bailamos" (Mijangos Recycled dub) – 9:23
 "Bailamos" (album version) – 3:38

US 12-inch single
A1. "Bailamos" (Harry "Choo Choo" Romero & Eric Morillo vocal mix) – 6:29
A2. "Bailamos" (Fernando's Latin mix) – 5:30
B1. "Bailamos" (Mijangos Recycled dub) – 9:23
B2. "Bailamos" (album version) – 3:38

Australasian CD single
 "Bailamos"
 "Bailamos" (Groove Brothers radio mix)
 "Nunca te olvidaré"
 "Bailamos" (Groove Brothers remix)

Charts and certifications

Weekly charts

Year-end charts

Certifications and sales

Release history

Cover versions
In 1999, Japanese singer Hideki Saijo sang the Japanese version of "Bailamos" under the title "Bailamos ~ Tonight We Dance" and has a remix version of the same song in 2000 under the title "Bailamos 2000". A year after the "Bailamos" release, in 2000, Sean Paul sampled the melody of the refrain in his song "Tiger Bone" featuring Mr. Vegas on his debut studio album Stage One. The use was uncredited, changing the lyrics from "Bailamos... let the rhythm take you over, bailamos... te quiero, amor mio" to "Tiger bone... when mi drink it and rub on a piece a stone... di gal dem bend up, when mi sen up". American Idol auditionee William Hung covered the album for his 2004 album ‘Inspiration’ albeit was quite negatively received.

See also
 List of number-one singles of 1999 (Spain)
 List of number-one hits (United States)
 Number-one hits of 1999 (U.S. Hot Latin Tracks)
 Number-one dance hits of 1999 (USA)

References

1999 singles
1999 songs
Billboard Hot 100 number-one singles
Enrique Iglesias songs
Fonovisa Records singles
Interscope Records singles
Universal Music Group singles
Music videos directed by Nigel Dick
Music videos directed by Paul Hunter (director)
Number-one singles in Spain
Song recordings produced by Brian Rawling
Song recordings produced by Mark Taylor (record producer)
Songs about dancing
Songs written by Mark Taylor (record producer)
Songs written by Paul Barry (songwriter)
Songs written for films
Spanglish songs